Filippa Curmark (born 2 August 1995) is a Swedish footballer midfielder who plays for BK Häcken.

International goal

External links 
 
 
 
 

1995 births
Living people
Swedish women's footballers
Jitex BK players
BK Häcken FF players
Damallsvenskan players
Women's association football midfielders
Sportspeople from Jönköping
21st-century Swedish women